The 81st Infantry Division was an infantry division of the German Army during World War II.

History 
It was formed on 1 December 1939 at Truppenübungsplatz Neuhammer as part of the 6th wave (Austellungswelle).

During the Toropets-Kholm Offensive of late 1941, the division brought in by rail during the last days of December. Its first regiment—the 189th Infantry under Colonel Hohmeyer together with the 2nd Battalion of Artillery Regiment 181 and the 3rd Company of the Engineer Battalion 181—was immediately ordered to detrain at Toropets and Andreapol. From there, it advanced to Okhvat where it was encircled and completely destroyed on 14 January. 1,100 dead were later found in a forest near Okhvat, including the regimental commander who was posthumously promoted to Major General. A total of 40 survivors from the artillery battalion made it back to the German lines. The move into action and collapse was so swift that the regiment was not even identified on German situation maps.

Order of battle

1939

Infantry Regiment 161
Infantry Regiment 174
Infantry Regiment 189
Artillery Regiment 181
Engineer Battalion 181
Anti-Tank Detachment 181
Infantry Divisions Message Detachment 181
Infantry Divisions Supply Leader 181

1944
Grenadier Regiment 161
Grenadier Regiment 174
Grenadier Regiment 189
Divisions Fusilier Battalion 61
Artillery Regiment 181
Engineer Battalion 181
Panzerjäger Detachment 181
Infantry Divisions Message Detachment 181
Infantry Divisions Supply Leader 181

Commanding officers
Generalleutnant Friedrich-Wilhelm von Loeper (1 December 1939 – 5 October 1940)
Generalmajor Hugo Ribstein (5 October 1940 – 8 December 1941)
Generalleutnant Erich Schopper (8 December 1941 – 1 March 1943)
Generalleutnant Gottfried Weber (1 March 1943 – 13 March 1943)
Generalleutnant Erich Schopper (13 March 1943 – 1 June 1943)
Generalleutnant Gottfried Weber (1 June 1943 – 30 June 1943)
Generalleutnant Erich Schopper (30 June 1943 – 5 April 1944)
Generalleutnant Vollrath Lübbe (5 April 1944 – 1 July 1944)
Generalmajor der Reserve Dr. Ernst Meiners (1 July 1944 – 10 July 1944)
Generalleutnant Franz-Eccard von Bentivegni (10 July 1944 – 8 May 1945)

References 

 

0*081
Military units and formations established in 1939
1939 establishments in Germany
Military units and formations disestablished in 1945